Michael Flannery (7 January 1903 – 30 September 1994) was an Irish republican who fought in the Irish War of Independence and the Irish Civil War. He supported the Provisional IRA during The Troubles and was a founder of NORAID.

Irish revolutionary period
Flannery was born in Cangort, near Brosna, right on the border of County Offaly and County Tipperary, on 7 January 1903.

In 1916 he joined the Irish Volunteers alongside his brother Peter, although he did not take part in the Easter Rising. However, he did participate in the Irish War of Independence. Following the outbreak of the Irish Civil War, he fought as part of the Anti-Treaty IRA until his capture by the National Army on 11 November 1922 in Roscrea, County Tipperary. He was imprisoned for nearly a year and a half in Dublin's Mountjoy Prison (C Wing). While there he witnessed the execution of Anti-Treaty IRA leaders Richard Barrett, Joe McKelvey, Liam Mellows and Rory O'Connor from his cell window. Following Flannery going on a 28-day hunger strike, he was placed in the Curragh Prison Camp until 1 May 1924 when he was finally released, a full year after the end of the civil war.

Moving to New York

In February 1927 he immigrated to the United States of America, settling in Jackson Heights, Queens, New York City. In 1928 he married Margaret Mary Egan, a Tipperary-born research chemist, who had been educated at University College Dublin and University of Geneva.

Following the creation of Fianna Fáil and their entry into the Irish Parliament Dáil Éireann, Flannery became affiliated with Sinn Féin, who had voted to retain their abstentionist policy towards the Dáil and their refusal to acknowledge it as the legitimate government of Ireland. Sinn Féin tasked Flannery with drumming up support for the party in New York. However, following the start of the Great Depression Flannery found it difficult to focus on politics in the face of mounting poverty. By 1933 finding support for Sinn Féin and the IRA became particularly tough when Fianna Fáil expanded greatly the range of people eligible for military pensions, which under the previous government had been biased against members of the Anti-Treaty IRA.

For the next 40 years Flannery would work for the Metropolitan Life Insurance Company.

During The Troubles
Upon the onset of The Troubles in Northern Ireland, Flannery was once again drawn into the world of Irish Republicanism. In a response to the mounting violence, Flannery set up the Irish Northern Aid Committee, or as it became better known as, NORAID. The official purpose of NORAID was to provide funds to the families of imprisoned Irish Republicans and victims of violence. However, opponents levelled the accusation against the organisation that it was also providing funding directly to the Provisional Irish Republican Army, and perhaps even also supplying firearms. 
 
In 1970 he travelled around America and set up 62 chapters of NORAID. In 1971 he said: "The more coffins sent back to Britain, the sooner this will be all over", referring to British soldiers.

In 1982 he was indicted, with four other members of NORAID (Thomas Falvey, Daniel Gormley, George Harrison and Patrick Mullin), for arms smuggling, but all defendants were acquitted after their legal defence was able to successfully argue their actions had been sanctioned by the Central Intelligence Agency (CIA). There is no evidence the CIA sanctioned Flannery’s actions. During the trial, Flannery said himself that: 

I came [to the US] directly from Ireland. I was a member of the Irish Republican Army until I left Ireland. When I came here, there had been a general exodus of young Irishmen and women from Ireland from 1924 to 1927 and I came here purposely to organise these people so they would be a help to the militant movement, to the IRA at home, to complete the freedom of Ireland.

Four months after the verdict of the arms trial, Flannery was named as Grand Marshall of the Saint Patrick's Day Parade in New York City. His appointment caused considerable controversy within the Irish-American community and several high-profile figures boycotted the parade that year, including the Archbishop of New York Terence Cooke.

In 1986 Flannery quietly resigned from NORAID following the decision by Sinn Féin to drop its abstentionist policy in the Republic of Ireland and to recognise Dáil Éireann as the legitimate governing body of Ireland.

He opposed the Northern Ireland peace process, believing that Sinn Féin and the Provisionals had "sold out", and believed the removal of British troops from Northern Ireland was the only starting point upon which negotiations could begin.

He died 30 September 1994, aged 91.

References

1903 births
1994 deaths
Irish Republican Army (1919–1922) members
Irish Republican Army (1922–1969) members
People of the Irish War of Independence
People from County Tipperary
Irish republicans